Herschel Millard Hogg (November 21, 1853 – August 27, 1934) was a U.S. Representative from Colorado.

Early life and education
Born in Youngstown, Ohio, Hogg attended the common schools. He graduated with a Bachelor's degree from Monmouth College, Monmouth, Illinois in June 1876. He studied law and received his Master's degree in 1879. He was admitted to the bar in Illinois in 1878.

Career
He commenced practice in Indianola, Iowa. He moved to Gunnison, Colorado, in 1881 and resumed the practice of law. He served as City attorney of Gunnison in 1882 and 1883. He served as district attorney of the seventh judicial district of Colorado 1885-1893. He moved to Telluride, Colorado, in 1888, where he served as City attorney 1890-1898. He served as County attorney of San Miguel County, Colorado from 1890 to 1902.

Hogg was elected as a Republican to the 58th and 59th Congresses (March 4, 1903 – March 3, 1907). He introduced a bill in 1906 to have Mesa Verde made a national park. Senator Thomas M. Patterson also introduced a bill in the Senate. It was signed into law by President Theodore Roosevelt on June 29, 1906.

He resumed the practice of law in Cortez, Colorado. He retired from political life in 1915. He engaged in mining, and resided in Denver, Colorado.

Personal life
On June 17, 1880, he married Josephine Houghtaling in Indianola, Iowa. In 1899, the Hoggs built a house at 123 N. Aspen Street in Telluride, which is still called the Hogg House. They lived there for ten years. He also had a ranch at Deep Creek Mesa, four miles west of Telluride, still called Hogg Ranch. It was important for the development of dairy and cattle operations and cultivation of hay in the Telluride area. Both properties are considered of historic and cultural value.

He died on August 27, 1934 in Denver. He was interred in Crown Hill Cemetery.

References

External links

1853 births
1934 deaths
Republican Party members of the United States House of Representatives from Colorado
Politicians from Youngstown, Ohio
People from Monmouth, Illinois
People from Indianola, Iowa
People from Gunnison, Colorado
People from Telluride, Colorado
Lawyers from Youngstown, Ohio